Justice Knight may refer to:

Jesse Knight (judge), associate justice of the Wyoming Supreme Court
Samuel Knight (judge), associate justice of the Vermont Supreme Court

See also
Knight of Justice, member of the first of the three classes the Sovereign Military Order of Malta